Wulanhua is the name of several cities in the People's Republic of China.

It may refer to:

Jilin province

Tongyu county 
 Wulanhua

Inner Mongolia autonomous region

Siziwang county 
 Wulanhua